Antonio Díaz Municipality may refer to:

 Antonio Díaz Municipality, Delta Amacuro
 Antonio Díaz Municipality, Nueva Esparta